Rubidoux High School is a four-year public high school in Jurupa Valley, California. It is part of the Jurupa Unified School District, and it opened in 1959. It is one of four high schools in the district, the others being Jurupa Valley High School, Patriot High School, and Nueva Vista High School, a continuation school.

As of the 2014-15 school year, the school had an enrollment of 1,629 students and 67.88 classroom teachers (on an FTE basis), for a student-teacher ratio of 24.00.

History 
Rubidoux High School has opened its doors in 1959 as the first high school in the "West Riverside" area. The school mascot is Freddy, the Falcon. The football field and stadium was named Edward E. Hawkins Stadium after a prominent community member and former superintendent of the school district.

Notable alumni
Orshawante Bryant, Arena football player
Dan Giese, Major League Baseball pitcher for the San Francisco Giants, New York Yankees, and Oakland Athletics
Duncan Hunter, politician
Sammy Knight, former University of Southern California and NFL strong safety
Josesito Lopez, professional boxer
Chad Marshall, soccer defenseman for the Columbus Crew SC and Seattle Sounders FC of the Major League Soccer.
Anthony Prior, gridiron football player

References

External links
School website

Educational institutions established in 1959
High schools in Riverside County, California
Jurupa Valley, California
Public high schools in California
1959 establishments in California